Lemont is an unincorporated community and census-designated place (CDP) in Centre County, Pennsylvania, United States, and is the location of the only remaining granary in Pennsylvania. It is part of the State College, Pennsylvania Metropolitan Statistical Area. The population was 2,270 at the 2010 census.

Geography
Lemont is located in southern Centre County at  (40.809911, -77.818152), in the center of College Township. U.S. Route 322, the borough bypass, forms the western edge of Lemont. It is bordered by Houserville to the north.

The community is in the valley of Spring Creek, a northward-flowing tributary of Bald Eagle Creek and part of the Susquehanna River watershed. The southwestern end of Mount Nittany rises above the eastern edge of the village.

Demographics

As of the census of 2010, there were 2,270 people, 924 households, and 594 families residing in the CDP. The population density was 1,837.3 people per square mile (709.4/km). There were 972 housing units at an average density of 786.7/sq mi (303.8/km). The racial makeup of the CDP was 94.2% White, 1.8% Black or African American, 0.2% Native American, 1.9% Asian, 0.4% from other races, and 1.5% from two or more races. Hispanic or Latino of any race were 1.3% of the population.

There were 924 households, out of which 30.0% had children under the age of 18 living with them, 53.8% were married couples living together, 3.5% had a male householder with no wife present, 7.0% had a female householder with no husband present, and 35.7% were non-families. 25.2% of all households were made up of individuals, and 6.1% had someone living alone who was 65 years of age or older. The average household size was 2.45 and the average family size was 3.00.

In the CDP, the population was spread out, with 22.1% under the age of 18, 8.4% from 18 to 24, 27.4% from 25 to 44, 31.0% from 45 to 64, and 11.1% who were 65 years of age or older. The median age was 39 years. For every 100 females, there were 100.2 males. For every 100 females age 18 and over, there were 103.9 males.

The median income for a household in the CDP was $89,783, and the median income for a family was $97,302.  The per capita income for the CDP was $33,795. About 3.6% of families and 8.0% of the population were below the poverty line, including 6.4% of those under age 18 and none of those age 65 or over.

Historic district

The Lemont Historic District is home to many historic homes and businesses. The John Thompson Coal Sheds and Granary is the last remaining wooden grain elevator in Pennsylvania and is being restored by the Lemont Village Association. Lemont Elementary School, built from 1938 to 1939 as College Township School, is a limestone building that overlooks the village. The State College Area School District is considering closing the school; however, many district residents are opposed. The Friends of Lemont School was organized to spearhead an effort to combat the closure and sponsored an on-line petition to keep the neighborhood school. According to the State College school board meeting minutes of June 16, 2017 there will be a hearing to close Lemont Elementary school on July 24, 2017 prior to the board meeting.

References

External links
Lemont Village Association

Census-designated places in Centre County, Pennsylvania
Census-designated places in Pennsylvania